Say It with Flowers (Swedish: Säg det med blommor) is a 1952 Swedish comedy film directed by Lars-Eric Kjellgren and starring Annalisa Ericson, Stig Järrel and Gunnar Björnstrand. It was shot at the Råsunda Studios in Stockholm. The film's sets were designed by the art director Nils Svenwall. It is based on the 1920 play Seeing Things by American writer Margaret Mayo.

Cast
 Annalisa Ericson as Peggy
 Stig Järrel as 	Hasse aka Hans Nåd
 Gunnar Björnstrand as 	Oskar Blomkvist
 Naima Wifstrand as 	Mrs. Lagerberg
 Elisaveta as Gun Lagerberg
 Mimi Nelson as 	Monica
 Sif Ruud as 	Helena Blomkvist
 Elsa Ebbesen as 	Hulda
 Gunwer Bergkvist as 	'Bojan' 
 Karl-Arne Holmsten as 	Kirre
 Elof Ahrle as 	Karlsson
 Ragnar Klange as Police Captain
 Carl-Axel Elfving as Porter
 Magnus Kesster as 	Policeman
 Wiktor Andersson as 	Porter at Mosebacke 
 Georg Adelly as 	Porter at Park Avenue Hotel 
 Sven-Axel Carlsson as 	Bicyclist 
 Gunnar Ekwall as 	Policeman 
 Claes Falkenberg as 	Gentleman in the Katarina Elevator 
 Anna-Lisa Fröberg as 	Oskar Blomkvist's secretary 
 Gustaf Färingborg as Policeman 
 Mary Gräber as 	Woman at the hairdresser's 
 Ingemar Jacobsson as 	Policeman 
 Solveig Lagström as Mrs. Blomkvist 
 Arne Lindblad as 	Lady's hairdresser 
 Yvonne Lombard as Greta, Peggy's friend 
 Wilma Malmlöf as Lady in the Katarina Elevator 
 Sten Mattsson as Bicyclist 
 John Melin as 	Gentleman in the Katarina Elevator 
 Sven-Bertil Norberg as 	Erik Holmer, Peggy's cousin 
 Björn Näslund as Bicyclist 
 Millan Olsson as Lady in the Katarina Elevator 
 Hanny Schedin as Supervisor 
 Tord Stål as 	Clerk at the radio 
 Carla Wiberg as Bather

References

Bibliography 
 Qvist, Per Olov & von Bagh, Peter. Guide to the Cinema of Sweden and Finland. Greenwood Publishing Group, 2000.

External links 
 

1952 films
Swedish comedy films
1952 comedy films
1950s Swedish-language films
Films directed by Lars-Eric Kjellgren
Swedish films based on plays
1950s Swedish films